The PLK Best Young Player award was an annual award in the Polish PLK that is given to the best player with the requirement for the player to be under 21 years old. A select group press members voted for the winner of the award. The last time the award was handed out was in the 2014–15 season.

Winners

References

External links
Polska Liga Koszykówki - Official Site 
Polish League at Eurobasket.com

Best Young Player